Zemrane Charqia is a small town and rural commune in El Kelâat Es-Sraghna Province of the Marrakesh-Safi region of Morocco. At the time of the 2004 census, the commune had a total population of 27,415 people living in 4198 households.

References

Populated places in El Kelâat Es-Sraghna Province
Rural communes of Marrakesh-Safi